The French River is a  river in Saint Louis County, Minnesota, United States, flowing into Lake Superior at the unincorporated community of French River in Duluth Township.  The river also flows through Normanna and Lakewood townships.

See also
List of rivers of Minnesota

References

Minnesota Watersheds
USGS Hydrologic Unit Map - State of Minnesota (1974)

Rivers of Minnesota
Tributaries of Lake Superior
Rivers of St. Louis County, Minnesota